Karaga is a folk dance of Karnataka and parts of Karnataka which originated as a ritual dedicated to Draupadi as known in these parts as Droupadmma. The ritual is performed on a full moon day.

The ritual pot filled with water and adorned with decorations several feet high is carried by the priest. The dancers perform various acrobatic feats while following the procession accompanied by a number of musical instruments like 'Thavi', "Nadaswaram", "Muni", "Udukka", "Pamba", etc.

Karaga festivities of Karnataka
The karaga itself is a mud pot, on which stands a tall floral pyramid that is balanced on the carrier's head. The contents of the pot have remained a secret down the centuries. The carrier's arrival is heralded by hundreds of bare-chested, dhoti-clad, turbaned Veerakumaras bearing unsheathed swords. Tradition has it that this frenzied procession of Veerakumaras accompanying the karaga carrier can execute him should he stumble and let the karaga fall. This festival that takes place in the central part of the city is called as Bangalore Karaga.

The Karaga Carrier 
The Karaga carrier is taken from his home by the members of the Dharmaraya Temple.  The carrier's wife takes on the role of a widow. Her mangala sutra (necklace symbolizing marriage) and bangles are worn by her husband and she is not to see him or the Karaga until the conclusion of the festival. The Vahnikula Kshatriyas, who hold Draupadi as their principal deity, believe that Draupadi Shakti (power) brims over during the Karaga festival and the Karaga carrier dressing as a female is symbolic of Draupadi. The Karaga is expertly balanced on the carrier's head. The carrier is practically in a trance even as he dances along with the Veerakumaras. The Veerakumaras hit the swords on their bare chests, saying "dik-di dik-di".

Significance 
The rituals have their origin in the Mahabharata, particularly in the vastrakshepa (stripping) of Draupadi, the exile of the Pandavas and the death of Draupadi's sons at the hands of Ashwathama. After all these trials and tribulations, she emerged as a symbol of strong and ideal womanhood.

Narasapura karaga the Historical karaga (Narasapura Kolar Taluk)  
Narasapura karagamahotsava. Karaga festival in Narasapura is celebrated in the month of March or April or May. In the name of the Draupadi and Dharmaraya Swamy, the procession starts usually at midnight and visits all the houses of Narasapura. There will be 2 kinds of Karaga, first called as Hasi KARAGA, two days prior to the main Hoovina Karaga. pallakki of all gods which are in Narasapura town goes around throughout the village. Narasapura karaga is very famous festival in kolar Karnataka region . The festival would be started 11 days before a full moon day  every year by starting with dwajarohana and ends with grand sapthakalasha karaga festival. The Karaga festival is a traditional community function of Vahnikula Kshatriya who largely resides in Narasapura town and they are performing this festival since from 100 years. Sri Dharmaraya swamy temple situated in Narasapura town attracts thousands of devotees on the occasion of Karaga Festival. Narasapura Karaga attracts about 30000 to 40000 people from nearby villages and towns. people of  Narasapura invite all of their friends and relatives for this festival and whole  streets and houses of Narasapura would be decorated with serial lights, Rangoli would be drawn in front of houses to welcome Karaga to their houses with a lot of shraddha and bhakti. People offer prayers to the goddess Draupadi on the day of Karaga. Narasapura Karagamahotsava is Pride of Kolar District.

Varthur Karaga
Varthur(varapuri) Karaga festival is celebrated in the month of February (in the week of Rathasapthami). In the name of Draupadi and Dharmaraya Swamy, the procession starts usually at 12:30 am midnight. After coming out of Sri Dharamaraya Swamy temple, the Karaga goes to Mosque/Masjid of Varthur which is unique in India and also it defines the unique bonding between the brothers and sisters of both Hindus and Muslims in this part of the town. After visiting mosque, the karaga starts to visits all the houses of Varthur, especially to the houses of Kshatriyas. There are two types of Karaga, Hasi Karaga, in the evening of Rathasapthami which is devoted to Sri Chennaraya Swamy two days prior to the main Hoovina Karaga (made of Jasmine flowers). Sri chennaraya Swamy Chariot will be pulled by huge devotees, a round throughout the village. Varthur karaga is a very famous festival in East region of Bangalore, which has its history of several decades. The festival would be started two weeks before Rathasapthami day, every year by pulling Sri chennaraya Swamy chariot and ends with grand Karaga festival. The Karaga festival is traditional function of Vahnikula Kshatriya community who largely resides in Varthur and surrounding villages and perform this festival for more than 100 years. Sri Dharmaraya swamy temple situated in varthur town attracts thousands of devotees on the occasion of Karaga Festival. The Karaga attracts more than 50000 people from nearby villages and towns. Varthur comes alive on this three-day festival which attracts attendees from near and far. The town glitters with lights and floral decorations. There is much prasada distribution in the form of rice and other foods. Residents welcome Karaga to their houses with much shraddha and bhakti. People offer prayers to the goddess Draupadi on the day of Karaga.

Karaga in Ramagondanahalli
Karaga festival in Ramagondanahalli is celebrated in the month of March (on Holi Festival). In the name of Draupadi and Dharmaraya Swamy, the procession starts usually at midnight and visits all the houses of Ramagondanahalli, Varthur Kodi. There will be two kinds of Karaga, first called as Hasi Karaga, two days prior to the main Hoovina Karaga. The chariot is pulled by villagers, around throughout the village. Ramagondanahalli Karaga is a very famous festival in East region of Bangalore. The festival would be started 11 days before a full moon day (March in Ramagondanahalli) every year by pulling chariot and ends with grand Karaga festival. The Karaga festival is traditional community function of Vahnikula Kshatriya community who largely resides in Ramagondanahalli and they are performing this festival. Sri Dharmaraya swamy temple situated in Ramagondanahalli town attracts thousands of devotees on the occasion of Karaga Festival. Ramagondanahalli Karaga attracts about 25,000 to 30,000 people from nearby villages and towns. People of Ramagondanahalli invite all of their friends and relatives for this festival and whole streets and houses of Ramagondanahalli would be decorated with serial lights, rangoli would be drawn in front of all the houses of Ramagondanahalli and Kodi Villages to welcome Karaga to their houses with lot of shraddha and bhakti. People offer prayers to the goddess Draupadi on the day of karaga.

References

External links
Karaga Website

Festivals in Karnataka